G. James Daichendt (born 1975) is an art critic and art historian.  He serves as the Dean of the Colleges and Professor of Art History at Point Loma Nazarene University in Southern California. He is also a professor at Boston University.

Dr. Daichendt founded and is the Principal Editor for the academic journal "Visual Inquiry: Learning and Teaching Art." He has written six books. The most recent are texts about the artists Kenny Scharf "In Absence of Myth" and Shepard Fairey "Shepard Fairey Inc. Artist/Professional/Vandal." His text Stay Up! Los Angeles Street Art earned him the title Professor Street Art. He has also received academic attention for his texts Artist Scholar: Reflections on Writing and Research and Artist-Teacher: A Philosophy for Creating and Teaching. Daichendt lectures regularly on the subject of art education and street art and was featured on TED Talk, The Streets as Canvas. He has authored biographies on artists Robbie Conal and Kenny Scharf.

Dr. Daichendt's writing has appeared in The San Diego Union-Tribune, KCET Artbound, LA Weekly, Artillery: Killer Text on Art, ArtScene, Art Education, International Journal of Art and Design Education, Visual Inquiry: Learning and Teaching Art, Pasadena Scene Magazine, Beverly Hills Lifestyle, Cassone: The International Online Magazine of Art and Art Books, APU Life, Teaching Artist Journal, and The Art Book. He lives in California with his wife and three children.

Education
BA, 1998, Azusa Pacific University
MFA 2002, Boston University
EdM 2003, Harvard University
EdD 2009, Columbia University

Books
Robbie Conal: The Life of a Guerrilla Artist (forthcoming)
The Urban Canvas: Street Art Around the World (2017)
Kenny Scharf: In Absence of Myth (2016)
Shepard Fairey Inc. Artist/Professional/Vandal (2013)
Stay Up! Los Angeles Street Art (2012)
Artist Teacher: A Philosophy for Creating and Teaching (2011)
Artist Scholar: Reflections on Writing and Research (2010)

Catalog Essays

 Performing Research (2017). Los Angeles, CA: Fellows of Contemporary Art
 Becoming Loco (2017). Manhattan Beach Art Center
 British Invasion (2016). Lancaster, CA: Museum of Art and History.
 An Introduction to Post-Future: Art as a Sign and Symbol, An Interview with John Van Hamersveld (2016). Manhattan Beach Art Center.
 Servant to Infinite Distraction with Desire Obtain Cherish (2016). New York, NY: UNIX Gallery.
 Justin Bower: A Fractured Self (2016). Lancaster, CA: Museum of Art and History. 
 Enterprising Street art from Outside/In (2015). Pasadena, CA: Art Center College of Design. 
 A New Era for Alex Couwenberg (2015). Azsua, CA: Azusa Pacific Arts Press.  
 Pictures of Nothing Revisited (2014). La Verne, CA: University of La Verne.
 The Art of David Flores (2014). Azusa, CA: Azusa Pacific Arts Press & Cameron + Company.
 Tim Bavington: Poptivism (2014). Azusa, CA: Azusa Pacific Arts Press. 
Lynn Aldrich: Un/common objects (2013). Pasadena, CA: Art Center College of Design.
 Late Confessions: How and Nosm (2013). New York, NY: Jonathan LeVine Gallery.
 Embodied: A 10-Year retrospective of Kent Anderson Butler (2012). Pomona, CA: The W. Keith and Janet Kellogg University Art Gallery.

Editorial

 San Diego Union Tribune
 KCET ArtBound
 Principal editor, Visual Inquiry: Learning & Teaching Art
 ArtScene
 Artillery: Killer Text on Art
 Arts and culture editor, Beverly Hills Lifestyle Magazine
 Pasadena Scene Magazine and Pasadena Star News

References

External links

1975 births
Living people
American art critics
Harvard Graduate School of Education alumni
Teachers College, Columbia University alumni
Boston University College of Fine Arts alumni